Scroggins may refer to:

Scroggins (surname)
Scroggins Aviation, an American aviation special effects company
Scroggins, Texas, an unincorporated community in the United States
Scroggins Draw, Texas, a valley in the United States
 USS Scroggins (DE-799), Buckley-class destroyer escort of the United States Navy.

See also 
Scroggin, a type of snack mix
Scoggins
Scogin